Son Costa / Son Fortesa is an underground station of Serveis Ferroviaris de Mallorca (SFM) and Palma Metro in Palma on the island of Majorca, Spain. The station is located at the northeasterly end of Miguel Fleta Street.

Access from the outside is through two separate entrances for each mode of transportation, without any connection inside the station. Each service has an island platform with tracks on each side.

References

Palma Metro stations
Railway stations in Spain opened in 2007